Lesley Hartwell is a former South African international lawn bowler.

Career 
In 1998 Hartwell won the Women's singles gold medal in lawn bowling at the 1998 Commonwealth Games in Kuala Lumpur. She defeated local hero Saedah Abdul Rahim of Malaysia 25-14 in the final after recovering from a 3-11 deficit.

The following year in 1999, she won the singles silver medal at the Atlantic Bowls Championships in her home country.

She still represents the Eastern Province.

References

Living people
South African female bowls players
Commonwealth Games medallists in lawn bowls
Commonwealth Games gold medallists for South Africa
1949 births
Bowls players at the 1998 Commonwealth Games
Medallists at the 1998 Commonwealth Games